Jacob Ngwira (born 17 September 1985) is a Malawian footballer who currently plays, Karonga United FC.

Career 
He played previously for South African side Carara Kicks, and Malawian clubs Super ESCOM and ESCOM United in the TNM Super League.

International career
He is member of the Malawi national football team and played at the 2010 African Cup of Nations.

References

1985 births
Living people
Malawian footballers
Malawi international footballers
2010 Africa Cup of Nations players
Expatriate soccer players in South Africa
Malawian expatriate sportspeople in South Africa
Malawian expatriate footballers
Association football midfielders
ESCOM United FC players
Carara Kicks F.C. players